Hubbard Foods Ltd is a New Zealand manufacturer of breakfast cereals based in Auckland. It sells cereals under its Hubbard brand and private labels. Its founder is Dick Hubbard, who stepped down as CEO from 2004-2007 to serve as the mayor of Auckland. According to The Sunday Star-Times, in July 2010, Hubbard was "The number three player, behind Sanitarium and Kellogg's, in the so-called 'ready-to-eat' cereal market" in New Zealand. It employs around 150 staff.

History
The company started in 1989 as Winner Foods, but, after two years, the company founder decided to put the family name on the cereal boxes and rename the company Hubbard Foods Ltd. In 2008, Hubbard considered selling the company but decided to retain his ownership.

In 2010, in coordination with Vector Limited, Hubbard Foods installed the largest commercial installation of thin-film solar PV panels in New Zealand on the roof of its South Auckland building.

In 2018, the Hubbard sold the company to HFG Group, which was soon renamed Walter & Wild, owned by Harry Hart and his father Graeme Hart.

References

External links

Food manufacturers of New Zealand
Food and drink companies based in Auckland
Manufacturing companies based in Auckland
New Zealand brands
Māngere-Ōtāhuhu Local Board Area